Konstantinos Katsidonis (born 7 September 1999) is a Greece international rugby league footballer who plays for the Rhodes Knights.

Playing career
In 2022, Katsidonis was named in the Greece squad for the 2021 Rugby League World Cup, the first ever Greek Rugby League squad to compete in a World Cup.

References

External links
Greece profile
Greek profile

1999 births
Greece national rugby league team players
Living people
Rugby league centres